Pablo Albano and Javier Frana were the defending champions, but lost in the quarterfinals this year.

Tomás Carbonell and Carlos Costa won the title, defeating Sergio Casal and Emilio Sánchez 6–4, 6–4 in the final.

Seeds

  Sergio Casal /  Emilio Sánchez (final)
  Marcos Ondruska /  Byron Talbot (first round)
 N/A
  Mike Bauer /  David Rikl (first round)

Draw

Draw

References

External links
 Draw

Doubles